The Boro or The Borough may refer to:
 The Borough, an area of London also known as Southwark
 The Borough (George Crabbe poem)
 The Boro, a nickname for Middlesbrough FC
 The Boro, a nickname for Scarborough Athletic FC